Hongik Ingan is the official educational motto of South Korea. The phrase can be translated to English as "To broadly benefit the human world". Hongik Ingan is the founding idea of Gojoseon and is known as the first concept founded by Dangun Wanggeom.

See also
 Three Principles of the Equality
 Ilminism — "Political Hongik Ingan" based on Ilminism is synonymous with "Dangun nationalism".

References

 
Korean culture
Korean nationalism
National symbols of South Korea
National mottos
Conservatism in South Korea